Lagunilla is a municipality in the Province of Salamanca, Spain.

It is bordered by Aldeacipreste, Colmenar de Montemayor, Valdelageve, Sotoserrano and Zarza de Granadilla.

Its postal code is 37724.

The 15th of August is the big festival of the town, which celebrates the "Virgen of the Ascension".  After this, no other festival is as important as that of September 14–15, "The Holy Christ of the Afflicted".

References

Municipalities in the Province of Salamanca